Tranny Lee Gaddy (January 8, 1894 – October 12, 1975) was an American football player and coach. He served as the head football coach at Millsaps College from 1931 to 1938.

Head coaching record

References

External links
 

1894 births
1975 deaths
American men's basketball players
Millsaps Majors football coaches
Mississippi State Bulldogs football players
Mississippi State Bulldogs men's basketball players
Mississippi State Bulldogs men's track and field athletes
People from Itawamba County, Mississippi
Players of American football from Mississippi
Basketball players from Mississippi